Leicester Secular Society is the world's oldest Secular Society. It meets at its headquarters, the Leicester Secular Hall in the centre of Leicester, England, at 75 Humberstone Gate.

Founding

Founded in 1851, the society is the oldest surviving of numerous Secular Societies formed throughout England in the mid-19th century, largely through the efforts of George Jacob Holyoake and his supporters. (The National Secular Society was founded in 1866).

The 'Principal Aims' of Leicester Secular Society as stated on current (2012) literature are:

1.  Challenging religious privilege and dogma

We advocate the separation of religion and state, proper representation of people with no religion, the ending of privileges for religious organisations and the secularisation of 'faith' schools. We challenge religious teachings that divert people away from reality.

2.  Defending rationalism and free speech

We believe people should be free to express and publish their beliefs, however controversial, without fear of prosecution, persecution or physical harm, as long as they accord the same rights to others. Anyone should be prepared to submit their views to vigorous debate, questioning of their evidence and testing of their conclusions.

3.  Working for justice and fairness

We believe our efforts should be devoted to the elimination of human misery, injustice, poverty and ignorance in the world as it is here and now. We oppose unfair discrimination, bigotry and coercion based on factors such as beliefs, racial or ethnic origins, disability, sex, age, sexuality or lifestyle.

4.  Promoting a morality for life

We believe moral values and virtues like fairness, kindness, loyalty and honesty arise from people needing to live together in peace and harmony, not from any religion. Moral rules must be judged by their consequences for people now, not by their appearance in the 'holy' writings of ancient societies.

History 

The society owes its survival partly to a long tradition of radical thought in Leicester, going back to the Lollards, Luddites, Dissenters, Chartists and the Cooperative movement, but also to the building of the Leicester Secular Hall in 1881. This was financed by subscription from the members although the Leicester engineer and councillor Josiah Gimson was the main benefactor. It was Gimson who chose the young and innovative architect, W Larner Sugden, and who engaged the sculptor Ambrose Louis Vago for the five busts on the front of the building which depict Robert Owen, Thomas Paine, Voltaire, Socrates and, most controversially, Jesus.
 
After Gimson's death in 1883, one of his sons, Sidney Gimson, became the mainstay of the society until shortly before his death in 1938. He was assisted by F. J. Gould as secretary from 1899 to 1908. Another son, Ernest Gimson, became famous as a designer in the Arts and Crafts movement of William Morris, whose speech on "Art and Socialism" at the Secular Hall in 1884 marked the beginning of the Socialist movement in Leicester.
 
In the period after the Second World War, the society went into a decline. Average weekly attendances dropped from a high of 50 to a low of 20. However, the recent resurgence of religion as a political issue has reinvigorated the membership.

Current status 

As of 2015, the membership stands at around 170.

The Society publishes a journal, The Leicester Secularist, which carries reviews of events at the Hall, discussion articles and news regarding secular issues in Leicester.  

A refurbishment of the ground floor of Secular Hall was completed in 2014.

The Society has adopted the strap line "for an inclusive and plural society free from religious privilege, prejudice and discrimination."

See also
 Freethought Association of Canada

References

External links
Leicester Secular Society

Secularism in England
Secularist organizations
Organizations established in 1851
Organisations based in Leicestershire
1851 establishments in England